Daniel Chapin Kinsey (January 22, 1902 – June 27, 1970) was an American hurdler and a scholar in physical education.

Born in St. Louis, Kinsey attended the University of Illinois, studying education. He won the gold medal in the 110-Metres Hurdles at the 1924 Summer Olympics in Paris.

He graduated in 1926 and continued his study in physical education at Oberlin College, where he would also work until 1959. Besides teaching, Kinsey was involved in coaching several school teams and was on the board of several committees and associations, such as the American Olympians Association.

In 1959, Kinsey left Oberlin and became a professor at Earlham College and at the Delta College, University Center, MI. He retired in 1967 and continued living in Richmond, Indiana. He died on vacation, visiting family, aged 68, soon after he retired.

References

1902 births
1970 deaths
American male hurdlers
Oberlin College alumni
Sportspeople from Richmond, Indiana
People from Oberlin, Ohio
Track and field athletes from St. Louis
University of Illinois College of Education alumni
University of Michigan faculty
Earlham College faculty
Athletes (track and field) at the 1924 Summer Olympics
Medalists at the 1924 Summer Olympics
Olympic gold medalists for the United States in track and field